Kolchuga may refer to 

Chainmail in Ukrainian and Russian.
Kolchuga passive sensor - the Ukrainian Passive Early Warning Radar